The Joplin Blasters were an American professional baseball team based in Joplin, Missouri. The Blasters were members of the South Division of the American Association of Independent Professional Baseball. The team's home games were played at a reconstructed Joe Becker Stadium. The team was managed by former Chicago Cubs player and minor league managing veteran Carlos Lezcano. A home game on May 21, 2015, against the Wichita Wingnuts inaugurated the franchise and its 100-game regular season.  The Blasters organization failed to pay the stadium lease during its final season. During the 2016 fall league meetings, it was confirmed by league commissioner Miles Wolff that the Blasters would not be returning for 2017.

Season-by-season records

References

External links
Joplin Blasters official website

Defunct American Association of Professional Baseball teams
Sports in Joplin, Missouri
Baseball teams established in 2015
Professional baseball teams in Missouri
2015 establishments in Missouri
Baseball teams disestablished in 2016
2016 disestablishments in Missouri
Defunct independent baseball league teams
Defunct baseball teams in Missouri